George Franklin "Paddy" Patterson (May 22, 1906 – January 20, 1977) was a professional ice hockey winger who played nine seasons in the National Hockey League (NHL). He was born in Kingston, Ontario.

As an NHL rookie, George scored the first goal for the newly named Toronto Maple Leafs in 1926–27. He was also a member of the following teams: the Montreal Canadiens, New York Americans, Boston Bruins, Detroit Red Wings, and St. Louis Eagles.

Patterson later coached senior ice hockey in Kingston. In 1951, Ontario Hockey Association executives Jack Roxburgh,  George Dudley, Frank Buckland and W. A. Hewitt, handed out a lifetime suspension to Patterson, for conspiring to deliberately lose a playoff series to avoid moving into a higher-level of playoffs, rather than staying in a lower level and potentially make more profits at home playoff games than on the road.

Career statistics

References

External links

1906 births
1977 deaths
Boston Bruins players
Boston Cubs players
Buffalo Bisons (AHL) players
Buffalo Bisons (IHL) players
Canadian ice hockey right wingers
Cleveland Barons (1937–1973) players
Detroit Red Wings players
Hershey Bears players
Ice hockey people from Ontario
Indianapolis Capitals players
Kitchener Greenshirts players
Montreal Canadiens players
New Haven Eagles players
New York Americans players
Providence Reds players
St. Louis Eagles players
Sportspeople from Kingston, Ontario
Toronto Maple Leafs players
Toronto Ravinas players
Canadian expatriate ice hockey players in the United States